Strale was one of four s built for the  (Royal Italian Navy) in the early 1930s. Completed in 1932, she played a minor role in the Spanish Civil War of 1936–1939 supporting the Spanish Nationalists and served in World War II.

Design and description
The Freccia-class destroyers were enlarged and improved versions of the preceding . Their complement during wartime was 185 officers and enlisted men.

The Freccias were powered by two Parsons geared steam turbines, each driving one propeller shaft using steam supplied by three Thornycroft boilers.

Their main battery consisted of four  guns in two twin-gun turrets, one each fore and aft of the superstructure. Anti-aircraft (AA) defense for the Freccia-class ships was provided by a pair of  AA guns in single mounts amidships and a pair of twin-gun mounts for  machine guns. They were equipped with six  torpedo tubes in two triple mounts amidships. Although the ships were not provided with a sonar system for anti-submarine work, they were fitted with a pair of depth charge throwers. The Freccias could carry 54 mines.

Construction and career
Strale was laid down by Cantieri navali Odero at their Genoa-Sestri Ponente shipyard on 20 February 1929, launched on 26 March 1931 and commissioned on 6 February 1932. After the Italians entered World War II in June 1940, she and the destroyer Baleno rammed and sank the British submarine  on 14 June. Strale accidentally ran aground near Cape Bon on 21 March 1942 and later was destroyed by torpedoes from the submarine  on 21 June.

Citations

Bibliography

External links
 Strale (1931)  Marina Militare website

Freccia-class destroyers
Ships built in Genoa
1931 ships
World War II destroyers of Italy
Ships sunk by British submarines
World War II shipwrecks in the Mediterranean Sea
Maritime incidents in June 1942
Maritime incidents in August 1942